Stomio is a village and a community of the Agia municipality. Before the 2011 local government reform it was the seat of the municipality of Evrymenes. The 2011 census recorded 553 inhabitants in the village. The community of Stomio covers an area of 37.985 km2.

Geography
It is situated on the Aegean Sea coast, south of the mouth of the river Pineios, and at the foot of densely vegetated Mount Ossa. It is 13 km southeast of Pyrgetos, 17 km north of Agia and 37 km northeast of Larissa.

History
The ancient city Eurymenae (also Erymnae) was situated near present Stomio. The Greek Orthodox Monastery of Saint Demetrius, situated on the mountain slope above Stomio, was founded in the 6th century and rebuilt in its present form in the 12th century by Byzantine emperor Alexios I Komnenos. Before 1927 Stomio was named Tsagezi, deriving from the Turkish Çay ağzı which translates to "river mouth". (Çay = river, ağız = mouth, ağzı = the mouth).

Population
According to the 2011 census, the population of the settlement of Omolio was 553 people, a decrease of almost 7% compared with the population of the previous census of 2001.

See also
List of settlements in the Larissa regional unit

References

External links
 Stomio on GTP Travel Pages

Populated places in Larissa (regional unit)